Vojtěch Věchet (8 February 1912 – 6 September 1988) was a Czechoslovak footballer. He played in five matches for the Czechoslovakia national football team from 1937 to 1939. He was also named in Czechoslovakia's squad for the Group 7 qualification tournament for the 1938 FIFA World Cup.

References

1912 births
1988 deaths
Czechoslovak footballers
Czechoslovakia international footballers
Place of birth missing
Association football goalkeepers
AC Sparta Prague players